In differential geometry, the tensor product of vector bundles E, F (over same space ) is a vector bundle, denoted by E ⊗ F, whose fiber over a point  is the tensor product of vector spaces Ex ⊗ Fx.

Example: If O is a trivial line bundle, then E ⊗ O = E for any E.

Example: E ⊗ E ∗ is canonically isomorphic to the endomorphism bundle End(E), where E ∗ is the dual bundle of E.

Example: A line bundle L has tensor inverse: in fact, L ⊗ L ∗ is (isomorphic to) a trivial bundle by the previous example, as End(L) is trivial. Thus, the set of the isomorphism classes of all line bundles on some topological space X forms an abelian group called the Picard group of X.

Variants 
One can also define a symmetric power and an exterior power of a vector bundle in a similar way.

See also 
 Tensor product of modules

Notes

References 
 Hatcher, Vector Bundles and K-Theory

Differential geometry